Tsumeb is a city of 15,000 inhabitants and the largest town in Oshikoto region in northern Namibia. Tsumeb is known as the "gateway to the north" of Namibia. It is the closest town to the Etosha National Park. Tsumeb used to be the regional capital of Oshikoto until 2008 when Omuthiya was proclaimed a town and the new capital. The area around Tsumeb forms its own electoral constituency and has a population of 44,113. The town is the site of a deep mine (the lower workings now closed) that in its heyday was known as "TCL" (after its operator Tsumeb Corporation Ltd.), but has since been renamed the Ongopolo Mine.

The town and the Tsumeb mine

The name Tsumeb is generally pronounced "TSOO-meb". The name is not a derivative of German, Afrikaans, or English. It has been suggested that it comes from Nama and means either "Place of the moss" or "Place of the frog". Perhaps this old name had something to do with the huge natural hill of green, oxidized copper ore that existed there before it was mined out.

The town was founded in 1905 by the German colonial power and celebrated its 100th year of existence in 2005.

Tsumeb is notable for the huge mineralized pipe that led to its foundation. The origin of the pipe has been hotly debated. The pipe penetrates more or less vertically through the Precambrian Otavi dolomite for at least 1300 m. One possibility is that the pipe was actually a gigantic ancient cave system and that the rock filling it is sand that seeped in from above. If the pipe is volcanic, as some have suggested, then the rock filling it (the "pseudo-aplite") is peculiar in the extreme.  The pipe was mined in prehistoric times but those ancient workers barely scratched the surface. Most of the ore was removed in the 20th century by cut-and-fill methods. The ore was polymetallic and from it copper, lead, silver, gold, arsenic and germanium were won. There was also a fair amount of zinc present but the recovery of this metal was always difficult for technical reasons. Many millions of tonnes of ore of spectacular grade were removed. A good percentage of the ore (called "direct smelting ore") was so rich that it was sent straight to the smelter situated near the town without first having to be processed through the mineral enrichment plant. The Tsumeb mine is also renowned amongst mineral collectors.  Between 1905 and 1996, the mine produced about 30 million tons of ore yielding 1.7 Mt copper, 2.8 Mt lead 0.9 Mt zinc, as well as 80 t germanium. The average ore grade was 10% Pb, 4.3% Cu, 3.5% Zn, 100 ppm Ag, 50 ppm Ge.

It is noted for 243 valid minerals and is the type location for 56 types of mineral. Some of the germanium minerals are only found in this mine.

Tsumeb, since its founding, has been primarily a mining town. The mine was originally owned by the OMEG (Otavi Minen- und Eisenbahn-Gesellschaft) and later by TCL (Tsumeb Corporation Limited) before its closure a few years ago, when the ore at depth ran out. The main shafts became flooded by ground water over a kilometre deep and the water was collected and pumped as far as the capital, Windhoek. The mine has since been opened up again by a group of local entrepreneurs ("Ongopolo Mining"). A fair amount of oxidized ore remains to be recovered in the old upper levels of the mine. It is highly unlikely, though, that the deepest levels will ever be reopened.

The other notable feature of the town is the metal smelter, currently owned by Namibia Custom Smelters, which was sold by Weatherly International to Dundee Previous Metals in 2010. The right of the smelter is currently owned by IXM. The Annual Copper Festival is a well-known event on the local festival calendar.

IUGS geological heritage site
In respect of it being 'one of the richest ore deposits with respect to variety, rarity and aesthetics of minerals in the world', the International Union of Geological Sciences (IUGS) included the 'Tsumeb Ore Deposit' in its assemblage of 100 'geological heritage sites' around the world in a listing published in October 2022. The organisation defines an IUGS Geological Heritage Site as 'a key place with geological elements and/or processes of international scientific relevance, used as a reference, and/or with a substantial contribution to the development of geological sciences through history.'

Sinkhole lakes and the world's biggest meteorite
Near to the town are two large sinkhole lakes, Lake Otjikoto and Lake Guinas ("Gwee-nus"). Guinas, at about 500 m in diameter, is somewhat larger in area than Otjikoto. A pioneering documentary movie about scuba diving in these lakes was made by Graham Ferreira in the early 1970s. The depths of the lakes are unknown, because towards the bottom both lakes disappear into lateral cave systems, so it is not possible to use a weight to sound them. Otjikoto, which has poor visibility (owing to pollution from agricultural fertilizers used nearby), is at least 60 m deep. The water in Guinas is completely clear and well over 100 m deep. Divers who have performed bounce-dives in Guinas to 80 m (strictly speaking, beyond the safe depth for such dives, especially given the altitude of the lake above sealevel) have reported that there was nothing but powdery-blue water below them. Guinas has been in existence for so long that a unique species of fish, Tilapia guinasana, has evolved in its waters.

When South Africa invaded German Southwest Africa, today's Namibia, in 1914, the retreating German forces eventually threw all of their weaponry and supplies into the deep waters of Otjikoto. Some of the material has been recovered for display in museums.

One of the largest and deepest underground lakes in the world lies a little to the east of Tsumeb, on a farm called Harasib. To reach the water in the cave one has either to abseil or to descend an ancient, hand-forged ladder that hangs free of the vertical dolomite walls of the cave for over 50 m. Here, too, SCUBA divers have descended as deep as they have dared (80 m) in the crystal-clear waters and have reported nothing but deep blue below them from one ledge of dolomite to the next with nothing discernible in the depths.

The largest meteorite in the world, called Hoba, lies in a field about forty minutes' drive to the southeast of Tsumeb, at Hoba West. It is a nickel-iron meteorite of about 60 tonnes.

Economy and infrastructure 
There are 105 commercial farms around Tsumeb. The area consists largely of rolling hills covered in thorn bush. Tsumeb falls under the dry woodland, savanna vegetation zone. The soil around Tsumeb varies in quality from very fertile red loam through black turf to chalky clay and loam. The district is thus suitable for intensified farming and crop production. There is an abundance of ground water and regular rainfall in the summer months. Irrigation makes the area even more productive. Farmers in the area grow citrus fruits with much success. The main crops grown are maize, sorghum and sunflowers. Cattle farming is also widespread.

Ohorongo Cement was established in 2007. The plant is situated between Tsumeb and Otavi on Farm Sargberg approximately 45 km south of Tsumeb. The plant has a production capacity of 650000 tonnes per annum, almost double the demand of the Namibian domestic market. It is owned by Schwenk KG. Limestone reserves appear to be adequate for approximately 300 years. Tsumeb has a concrete sleeper factory.

Every year the Tsumeb Municipality organises the Tsumeb Copper Festival. More than 200 small and medium enterprises (SMEs) and bigger exhibitors showcase their products and services at the annual fair. The festival takes place the last weekend of October annually at the United Nations Park. The four-day event, which is aimed at boosting the economic competitiveness of the town, draws crowds from all corners of the country and beyond. It also facilitates indirect investments in the hospitality sector.

Tsumeb's stadium, the Oscar Norich Stadium, has a capacity of 1,500.

Transport

There are main roads leading north, Ondangwa through to Oshakati and Angola, north-east a new constructed Bituminous Road to Tsintsabis leading to Katwitwi Border Post and Angola, east, Grootfontein through to Rundu and Katima Mulilo, and south, Otavi through to Otjiwarongo and Windhoek.

Tsumeb is connected to the national railway network operated by TransNamib.  Tsumeb was for most of the 20th century the terminus of the line but in recent times the track has been extended a further 260 km to reach Ondangwa.  There have been talks of extending the line to Oshikango and having the Government of Angola build a railroad from the north to connect the two countries together. The junction for the Ondangwa line is located at the "wrong end" of Tsumeb railway station, leaving it a dead end, though a second triangle is provided for through trains to bypass the station.

Tsumeb Airport is an airstrip east of town.

Politics
Tsumeb is governed by a municipal council that has seven seats. Nico Kaiyamo is one of the well-known and established local politicians.

In the 2010 local authority election, a total of 3,120 votes were cast in the city. SWAPO won with approximately 75% of the vote. Of the four other parties seeking seats, Rally for Democracy and Progress (RDP) received approximately 15% of the vote, followed by United Democratic Front (UDF, 5%), All People's Party (APP, 2%), and the Democratic Turnhalle Alliance (DTA, 2%) Despite being on the ballot, the Congress of Democrats (CoD) did not receive a vote. The 2015 local authority election was again won by SWAPO which gained six seats and 3,149 votes. The remaining seat went to the DTA which gained 291 votes.

The 2020 local authority election was also won by SWAPO which obtained 2,518 votes and gained four seats. The Independent Patriots for Change (IPC), an opposition party formed in August 2020, obtained 1,472 votes and gained two seats. The remaining seat went to the Popular Democratic Movement (PDM, the new name of the DTA) with 199 votes.

Town twinning 
  Chesterfield, UK
  Elverum, Norway

Notable residents

 Alfred Angula
 Benjamin Hauwanga
 Mburumba Kerina (1932–2021), co-founder of SWAPO, NUDO, and FCN
 Heino Senekal

Geography

Climate
Tsumeb has a hot semi-arid climate (Köppen: BSh), with hot summers and mild winters (with warm days and chilly nights).

Minerals 
Tsumeb belongs to the world's most prolific mineralogical sites. The minerals from Tsumeb are unsurpassed in variety and quality of form.
At least 170 mineral species have been cataloged, 20 minerals are found nowhere else.  The concentration of ingredients for Tsumeb's mineral formations originates in a sulfide deposit rich in many metals.  A non-arid environment plentiful in oxygen-rich groundwater contributed to leaching and re-deposition of these elements as new minerals, sometimes in crystalline formations.  There are rare secondary minerals of Pb, Cu, Zn, As, Sb and, reflecting the ore deposit chemistry, Ge, Ga and Cd as well. Minerals first described from Tsumeb include, according to Mindat.org:
 rare (but also a few common) arsenates: andyrobertsite, arsenbrackebuschite, arsendescloizite, arsentsumebite, biehlite, calcioandyrobertsite, chudobaite, duftite, ekatite, fahleite, feinglosite, ferrilotharmeyerite, gaitite, gebhardite, gerdtremmelite, helmutwinklerite, jamesite, johillerite, keyite, koritnigite, leiteite, ludlockite, lukrahnite, molybdofornacite, o'danielite, prosperite, reinerite, schneiderhöhnite, schultenite, sewardite, stranskiite, thometzekite, tsumcorite, warikahnite, wilhelmkleinite, zincgartrellite and zincroselite
 unique germanium (bartelkeite, calvertite, eyselite, fleischerite, germanite, itoite, krieselite (germanate topaz), mathewrogersite, otjisumeite, ovamboite, schaurteite and stottite) and gallium (gallobeudantite, söhngeite, tsumgallite) minerals
 others are: kegelite, minrecordite, otavite, plumbotsumite, queitite, sidpietersite (unique thiosulphate), stibioclaudetite, tsumebite and zincrosasite.

Educational institutes and training facilities
Tsumeb is home to a number of primary and secondary schools as well as an Adult Education Center, which resorts under the Ministry of Education and Culture.

Training facilities 
 Adult Education Center
 Namibia Institute of Mining and Technology (NIMT), Northern campus
 Polytechnic of Namibia Center
 University of Namibia Center

Schools 
 Etosha Secondary School
 Tsumeb Secondary School
 Otjikoto Secondary School
 Tsumeb Gymnasium
 Opawa Combined School
 Francis Galton Primary School
 Kuvukiland Primary School
 Tsumeb English Medium Primary School
 Nomtsoub Primary School
 Ondundu Primary School
 St. Francis Primary School

References

External links 

 Official Tsumeb Website
 Mindat mineral location information
 Ohorongo Cement Website
 Tsumeb Website
 Namibia Institute of Mining and Technology website
 The Mineralogical Record: Tsumeb!, special issue, Volume 8, Issue 3 – May/June 1977.

 
Cities in Namibia
Populated places in the Oshikoto Region
Mining communities in Africa
Populated places established in 1905
Mining in Namibia
1905 establishments in German South West Africa
Geological type localities
First 100 IUGS Geological Heritage Sites